Nadterechny District (Terkan khoşt) is an administrative and municipal district (raion), one of the fifteen in the Chechen Republic, Russia. It is located in the northwest of the republic. Its administrative center is the rural locality (a selo) of Znamenskoye. Population:  51,755 (2002 Census);  The population of Znamenskoye accounts for 18.4% of the district's total population.

Geography
Nadterechny District is located in the northwest of Chechnya.  The Terek River runs west-to-east along the northern border of Nadterkechny on its way to the Caspian Sea 160 km to the east.  The district is 25 km northwest of the city of Grozny, and about 1,400 km south of Moscow.  The area measures 45 km (north-south), and 20 km (west-east).  Its administrative center is the rural locality (a selo) of Znamenskoye.
Located on mountain plain between the Terek River and the Terek Ridge, the area is characterized by steppe vegetation, and forest along the river floodplain.   Because the river is fed by snowmelt in the Caucasus mountains, spring flooding can be significant.

The district is bordered on the northwest by Stavropol Krai, on the west by North Ossetia-Alania, on the southwest by Ingushetia, on the north by Naursky District, and on the southeast by Groznensky District.

References

Notes

Sources

External links
Nadterechny District on Google Maps
Nadterechny District on OpenStreetMap

Districts of Chechnya